The 1997–98 North Carolina Tar Heels men's basketball team represented the University of North Carolina at Chapel Hill during the 1997–98 NCAA Division I men's basketball season. The team's head coach was Bill Guthridge, who was in his first season as UNC's head men's basketball coach. The Tar Heels played their home games at the Dean Smith Center in Chapel Hill, North Carolina as members of the Atlantic Coast Conference.

Roster

Schedule and results

This season was Guthridge's first year as head coach, after the unexpected retirement of Dean Smith two months before the start of the season.

Guthridge instituted a "six starters" system, whereby the team's top six players, Antawn Jamison, Vince Carter, Ed Cota, Shammond Williams, Ademola Okulaja and Makhtar N'Diaye rotated positions in the starting five.

|-
!colspan=6 style=| Regular season

|-
!colspan=6 style=| ACC tournament
|-

|-
!colspan=6 style=| NCAA tournament
|-

Team players drafted into the NBA

References 

North Carolina Tar Heels men's basketball seasons
North Carolina
NCAA Division I men's basketball tournament Final Four seasons
North Carolina